Linus Yale Jr. (April 4, 1821 – December 25, 1868) was an American mechanical engineer, manufacturer, and co-founder with Henry R. Towne of the Yale Lock Company, which became the premier manufacturer of locks in the United States. He is best known for his inventions of locks, especially the cylinder lock. His basic lock design is still widely distributed today, and constitutes a majority of personal locks and safes.

Biography

Youth 
Linus Yale Jr. was born in Salisbury, New York. His ancestors were of the same family as Elihu Yale, the benefactor to and namesake of the well known Yale University, as the Yales of America were all descended from the same ancestor, Thomas Yale, Elihu's only uncle with the Yale name. Thomas Yale was the stepson of Governor Theophilus Eaton. Yale's father, Linus Yale Sr., opened a lock shop in the 1840s in Newport, New York, specializing in bank locks; he  was a successful inventor who specialized in expensive, handmade bank locks and mechanical engineering, and who held eight patents for locks and another half dozen for threshing machines, sawmill head blocks, and millstone dressers.

Career 
After some regular education Yale soon joined his father in his business and introduced some revolutionary locks that utilized permutations and cylinders. In 1858, Yale's father died, and Linus Yale Jr. became more involved with his father's lock company.

Yale opened his own shop about 1860 in Shelburne Falls, Massachusetts, specializing in bank locks.

He later founded a company with millionaire Henry Robinson Towne in the South End section of Stamford, Connecticut, called the Yale Lock Manufacturing Company. Throughout his career in lock manufacturing, Yale acquired numerous patents for his inventions and received widespread acclaim from clients regarding his products.

Work

Portrait painting
Young Yale developed an early affinity for portrait painting, but about 1850 decided to assist his father in improving bank locks and to study mechanical problems. However, his finesse in drawing and sketching proved to be useful, as his diagrams on his later designs of locks were detailed and clear.

Locks and mechanisms

In the 1860s, around the time he had opened his own shop in Shelburne Falls, Massachusetts, Yale specialized in bank locks. He introduced some combination safe locks and key-operated cylinder locks that were improvements on previously used locks. Possessing admirable skills in mechanics and lock making, Yale created one of the first modern locks that used a pin-tumbler design. The pin-tumbler design is also known as the cylinder design, and plays significant roles in today's locks and safes. Yale had previously harbored the practical implementation of the tumbler lock for decades, and had sketched the idea in 1844. Yale was convinced that key holes in traditional locks made the locks susceptible to thieves who could use picks, gunpowder explosives, and heat to thwart the locks. This led him to employ permanent dial and shaft designs in his inventions, known as "combination locks" today. Yale's best-known lock design, the cylinder pin-tumbler lock, utilized a key-operated lock concept first conceived in ancient Egypt over 4,000 years ago.

Yale's inventions were so successful and received such critical acclaim that he exhibited several of his lock designs at world's fairs in the United States and overseas, winning a number of awards at these exhibitions.

Throughout his career Yale acquired many patents, mostly related to his inventions of locks and safes, but also including mechanical problems. In 1858, he patented a device for adjusting at a right angle the joiners' square. In 1865 he patented a tool for reversing the motion of screw-taps. In 1868 he received two patents for improvements in mechanics' vises.

Inventions 
Yale had many inventions to his name throughout his career, thoroughly revolutionizing the locks industry and improving the security of financial institutions. Drawing on the principles first put to use in large wooden locks built by ancient Egyptians, Yale patented a pin tumbler lock for use in banks in 1851; he patented his pin tumbler lock for use in doors in 1863; in 1865 he patented the pin tumbler padlock, which are still widely used today. Yale's model of the padlock was smaller, sturdier, more reliable, and innovative, proving to be a distinction among locks of his day.

Yale Bank Lock 

In 1851 Yale invented what he referred to as the "Yale Magic Infallible Bank Lock", for safes and bank vaults. This design allowed the owner to change its combination and would also allow the key to secure the lock while being hidden away from the exterior of the door by a hardened steel plate, which covered the key-hole behind it.

Yale stated nine peculiarities for his Yale Magic Infallible Bank Lock that separated it from its peers: [1]
 Being without springs, there are none to fail; it is impossible to damage by fire, dampness, or neglect. The design rid itself of the vices of the springs that become rusty or softening by heat or moisture.
 The lock has a head that is detached from its key-bits, thus leaving a space between the head and the key-hole, making it virtually impossible to be picked.
 When the key is withdrawn, all print or record of its action is obliterated, and no tell-tale left for duplicate keys to be made
 Powder proof. No powder can possibly be introduced into the lock itself, which eliminates the threat of gunpowder explosions.
 Permutation lock has the ability to rearrange new key combinations.
 In the event of a lost key, a duplicate key can be set up to unlock the lock, and upon changing the arrangement of the lock, the lost key will be powerless to open the lock.
 The portability of the key conveys a vast advantage over traditional bank locks.
 Every motion of the lock is derived from movement of the hands rather than elements beyond the operator's control, such as dirt, rust, or memory.
 The lock is not liable to get out of order, having been made by first class machinists.

Other locks 
Yale Safe Lock 
Yale's second great invention came around 1863, which he coined the name "Yale’s Magic Infallible Safe/Door Lock". This lock has many of the scintillating qualities of the Yale Bank Lock, and is designed for fire-proof safes and cash doors, among other items. It does not utilize springs, and is powder, damp, fire, and thief proof. The lock is not, however, a permutation lock, but each lock is unique and two different locks can never be opened with the same key. In addition, the key must be withdrawn from the lock before the bolt can be unlocked, preventing the liability of carelessly leaving the key in the keyhole.

Yale Chilled Iron Vaults and Safes  
Yale's other significant invention is the Chilled Iron Bank Doors and Vaults. Previous bank doors, vaults, and safes had plates of hard cast behind soft wrought iron, which can be easily broken using the right amount of leverage and skillful vault-picking. The hard casts are often rigid and fragile, and susceptible to heavy tinkering. Yale used a lattice screen, or basketwork of soft, tough wrought iron, instead of the hard cast, infused in the metal covering of the vaults, thus producing incomparably strong corners and surfaces that Yale presented to be unbreakable.

Yale Manufacturing Company 

In 1868, Yale and Henry R. Towne founded the Yale Lock Manufacturing Company in Stamford, Connecticut, to produce cylinder locks.

Under Yale's ingenuity and wide promotion of his inventions, Yale Locks quickly spread around major corporations in the United States and were widely adopted. Among some of Yale's business tactics were exploiting the weaknesses in other locks and presenting how his were free of those vices; he did live demonstrations to corporate business executives and government officials that showed how he successfully picked the locks that were in operation. Due to these demonstrations and the sheer quality of Yale's locks, Yale Lock Manufacturing quickly gained business ground. The company's name was later changed to The Yale and Towne Manufacturing Company, which eventually became part of NACCO Industries.

 Cracking the Hobbs Lock
The prominent bank locks of Yale's day were the Hobbs or Newell locks. In an effort to present his locks over the continued usage of the Hobbs Locks, Yale contacted notable bankers and set up a live demonstration in which he successfully picked a Hobbs Lock. As described by Samuel Hammond, one of the bankers present at Yale's demonstration, "[he] proved that the Hobbs lock is able to be picked and demonstrated it using a fake wooden key that he made". [1]

 Challenge to the World
As part of Yale's business plan and effort to promote his Bank Locks, Yale presented a challenge to anyone who dared to pick his bank locks. He offered a $3000 (a hefty sum) reward to potential challengers, in the event that his locks were successfully picked.

Reception 
The utility of Yale Locks were soon widely approved and favored upon, and implemented by many firms and government agencies, including the U.S. Treasury Department, Mint of the U.S. in Philadelphia, Pennsylvania, among various CEOs and Presidents of major corporations. The clients' satisfaction in Yale's inventions was echoed in their appreciation letters addressed to Yale: [1]

"Briggs Bank, Clyde, April 30, 1856
Linus Yale Jr.,
Dear Sir: *** About two months since, during a dark and stormy night, our bank was entered by burglars, through an adjoining cellar wall, and the vault, which was of brick, was pierced, which left us without any other protection than one of your highly approved chilled iron Burglar-Proof Safes, with your magic lock attached; these we deem sufficient, for they successfully resisted all the various devices and expedients known and practiced by burglars. We have the most implicit confidence in their strength and safety, and feel assured that when once locked, we are more secure than we should be with any other safe and lock ever yet invented.
Yours, respectfully,
WH. H. Coffin, Cashier".

"I am convinced to this knowledge of the true principles of locks has enabled [Yale], in his lock, to overcome not only this, but every other known method of picking; and, in fact, I consider it and all respects superior to any other lock in the market".
-Samuel Hammond. NY, January 12, 1856

Death and legacy 

On a business trip to New York City in 1868, the same year that the Yale Manufacturing Company was founded, Yale died suddenly of a heart attack while negotiating to have his locks installed in a skyscraper, the Equitable Building. By that time, his locks were already selling well, and under Towne's management Yale Locks became the premier manufacturer of locks in the United States.

Yale's Locks still play a major part in today's security systems. In his later years, Yale perfected the mechanism known as the "clock lock" and invented the double lock, which placed two locks within one case to be operated by the same or different combinations. His improvements in locks and boxes for the post-offices are of recognized utility and worldwide adoption. The commonly used combination locks omnipresent today also owe their dues to Linus Yale Jr.

Following his death, his son John Brooks Yale joined Henry R. Towne, became Treasurer, and helped grow the enterprise into a global giant manufacturing business, employing 12 000 people with customers in 125 countries.

In 2006 Yale was inducted into the National Inventors Hall of Fame.

Family 
Linus married to Catherine Brookes by whom he had 3 children.

Catherine Brooks, his wife, was born in into an elite family. She was the daughter of John Brooks, a doctor and member of the Legislature. His grandson was the Governor of Wyoming Bryant Butler Brooks, and his cousin was the Bishop of Massachusetts Phillips Brooks. Catherine's favorite teacher was the famous Ralph Waldo Emerson, who was from Massachusetts as well. Her sister, Jean Brooks Greenleaf, was also married to Congressman Halbert S. Greenleaf, and was elected President of the New York State Women's Suffrage Association.

Linus Yale daughter, Madeline Yale Wynne, became an artist and philanthropist. She married Senator Henry Winn, son of Senator Reuben Winn.

John Brooks Yale (1845-1904) joined the Union League and married Marie Louise McCulloch, daughter of the U.S. Secretary of Treasury, Hugh McCulloch, who financed the American Civil War under Abraham Lincoln. He was also Treasurer of the Yale Lock Company, founded by his father, Representative of the Illinois Steel Company from N.Y. in the Empire Building, and scaled the Yale Lock Company with Henry R. Towne into a global company, with 12 000 workers and their products sold in more than 120 countries. The Illinois Steel Company was the largest steel producer in the United States and later acquired Carnegie Steel with J.P. Morgan.

Julian L. Yale (1848-1909) was the owner and President of Julian L. Yale & Co., a Railway supply business from the Railway Exchange Building in Chicago. He introduced the Shelby Steel Tube to the railway market.  His customers were Carnegie Steel, Illinois Steel, Lackawanna Steel, etc. He also became a member of the Union League Club of New York, the Union League Club of Chicago, the Chicago Club, the Chicago Athletic Association, the Cliff Dwellers Club, the Union Club, and the St. Louis Club.

Another member of his family was William Henry Yale (born 1859), dry goods merchant, owner of Townsend & Yale, one of the oldest and largest commission house in the U.S., with offices on Fifth Avenue, New York, Boston, Chicago, and Philadelphia. The firm was the sole agent of the Boston Manufacturing Company, one of the very first factories in America. He was a Yale graduate, and a member of the Yale Club, Union League Club of New York, and Sons of the American Revolution. His father, Henry Clay Yale (1829-1897), was also a member of the Union League Club of New York.

Listing of patents 
 May 6, 1851  — Newport, New York
 October 19, 1852  — Newport, New York
 December 21, 1852  — Newport, New York
 July 12, 1853  — Newport, New York
 June 3, 1856  — Newport, New York
 October 19, 1858  — Philadelphia, Pennsylvania
 November 9, 1858  — Philadelphia, Pennsylvania
 June 12, 1860  — Philadelphia, Pennsylvania
 January 29, 1861  — Philadelphia, Pennsylvania (Locks or fastenings for special use for drawers)
 May 14, 1861  — Philadelphia, Pennsylvania (Locks for use with special keys or a plurality of keys; keys therefor the key being a card, e.g. perforated, or the like)
 June 27, 1865  — Shelburne Falls, Massachusetts (Cylinder locks and other locks with tumbler pins which are set by pushing the key in)
 June 27, 1865  — Shelburne Falls, Massachusetts (Driving main working members rotary shafts, e.g. working-spindles)
 February 6, 1866  — Shelburne Falls, Massachusetts
 November 19, 1867  — Shelburne Falls, Massachusetts
 January 7, 1868  — Cooperstown, New York
 February 4, 1868  — Shelburne Falls, Massachusetts
 September 15, 1868  — Shelburne Falls, Massachusetts
 January 4, 1870  — Shelburne Falls, Massachusetts
 September 19, 1871  — Shelburne Falls, Massachusetts
 October 24, 1871  — Shelburne Falls, Massachusetts

References

Further reading 
 A dissertation on locks and lock picking, and the principles of burglar proofing: showing the advantages attending the use of the magic infallible bank lock, and the patent door lock, invented by Linus Yale Jr. ... and his patent chilled iron burglar-proof bank doors, vaults, and safes, which are adopted by the U.S. Treasury Department for all the new mints, custom-houses, and sub-treasuries in the United States; manufactured and sold by Linus Yale Jr. & Co. Philadelphia: T.K. and G Collins, Printers, 1856.
 "Locking Mechanisms". Inventor of the Week: Archive. Lemelson-MIT Program. http://web.mit.edu/invent/iow/yale.html.

External links

Inventor of the Week @ MIT http://web.mit.edu/invent/iow/yale.html
Yale Locks Manufacturing Company http://www.yalelock.com/en/yale/com/
Yale "In my own words" https://web.archive.org/web/20081202101943/http://www.northstar.k12.ak.us/schools/ryn/projects/inventors/yale/yale.html 
Linus Yale, ideafinder.com https://web.archive.org/web/20100926061527/http://ideafinder.com/history/inventions/yalelock.htm

1821 births
1868 deaths
American mechanical engineers
19th-century American inventors
Locksmiths
People from Herkimer County, New York
People from Newport, New York
People from Salisbury, Herkimer County, New York
People from Shelburne Falls, Massachusetts
Engineers from New York (state)